Petter Mørch Koren (22 January 1910 – 14 November 2004) was a Norwegian politician for the Christian Democratic Party.

He was a deputy member of Hedrum municipality council in the period 1937–1938 and held various positions in Oslo city council between 1947 and 1965. He was temporary County Governor of Akershus from 1966 to 1970, and County Governor from 1970 to 1979.

From August to September 1963 he served as the Minister of Justice and the Police during the short-lived centre-right cabinet Lyng. In 1972 he was again appointed to this post in the cabinet Korvald, which lasted until 1973.

A jurist by profession, he graduated with the cand.jur. degree from the University of Oslo in 1932. He worked as a civil servant in various government ministries, held numerous posts in public boards and committees, and worked as a judge.

References

1910 births
2004 deaths
Government ministers of Norway
Christian Democratic Party (Norway) politicians
Politicians from Oslo
County governors of Norway
University of Oslo alumni
Norwegian judges
Ministers of Justice of Norway